Camilla Gun Schelin (born 2 March 1982) is a Swedish former footballer who played as a defender for Kopparbergs/Göteborg FC of the Damallsvenskan. Her sister is Lotta Schelin.

International career
Schelin won seven caps for the Sweden women's national under-17 football team.

Personal life
In 2015 Schelin was married to Fredrik and had a baby son named Melvin.

References

External links

1982 births
Living people
Swedish women's footballers
Linköpings FC players
Damallsvenskan players
BK Häcken FF players
Jitex BK players
Footballers from Gothenburg
Women's association football defenders